Amílcar Lopes da Fonseca (born 15 February 1954), known as simply Amílcar, is a Portuguese retired footballer who played as a defender.

External links
 
 

1954 births
Living people
Footballers from Lisbon
Portuguese footballers
Association football defenders
Primeira Liga players
Liga Portugal 2 players
G.D. Estoril Praia players
C.F. Os Belenenses players
Portimonense S.C. players
C.F. Estrela da Amadora players
Portugal international footballers
Portuguese football managers
Portimonense S.C. managers